TeamDynamix  is a Saas-based IT Service Management (ITSM), Project Portfolio Management (PPM), and Integration Platform as a Service (iPaaS) software vendor. TeamDynamix's headquarters is located in Columbus, Ohio, and also offers consulting services.

History 
TeamDynamix was founded in 2001 in Columbus, Ohio.

Products 
 IT Service Management (ITSM) includes Incident / Problem Management, Change Management, Release Management, Asset Discovery & Management, and a highly configurable, WCAG 2.0 AA compliant Self-Service Portal and Knowledge Base with WCAG 2.0 AA compliant support. Organizations can adopt ITIL (Information Technology Infrastructure Library) with the platform.  

 Project Portfolio Management (PPM) includes project management, project intake, governance, time tracking, reporting, and dashboards.  

 Enterprise Service Management (ESM) 

 Integration Platform as a Service (iPaaS) consists of API management, a connector library, and a visual, drag & drop flow builder.

References 

Software companies based in Ohio